The 2022 FIBA Polynesia Basketball Cup was an international basketball tournament contested by national teams of Polynesia sub-zone of FIBA Oceania. The tournament was hosted by Cook Islands, although the tournament was held in Kaitaia, New Zealand. Originally slated to be held from 6 to September 2021, the schedule was pushed further to April 2022 due to COVID-19 pandemic, with the final dates determined to be held on November 1–5.

The competition served as the sub-regional qualification phase for the basketball event of the 2023 Pacific Games in Solomon Islands with two berths allocated in this tournament, which serves as the official qualifier to the FIBA Asia Cup Pre-Qualifiers.

 successfully defended their title after sweeping all opponents in this single round-robin tournament. Along with second-placer , they will represent Polynesia in the men's basketball tournament of the 2023 Pacific Games.

Teams
The following national teams are expected to participate in the competition.

 
 (Host)

Round robin

{{basketballbox|date=3 November 2022 |time=19:30 |place=Puna Ora Gymnasium, Kaitaia, New Zealand
|teamA =  |scoreA = 91
|teamB =  |scoreB = 90
|Q1 = 23–19 |Q2 = 18–24 |Q3 = 22–14 |Q4 = 11–17 |OT = 17–16
|report = Boxscore
|points1 = Burton 26
|rebounds1 = Sofara 11
|assist1 = Samuelu, Su'A 2
|points2 = Teiti 22
|rebounds2 = Bluegum 19
|assist2 = Bluegum 2 
|referee =
}}

Final standings

Awards

 All-Star Team:'''
  Viliami Foketi
  Shareef Saipaia
  Larry Teriitemataua
  Marcus Alipate
  Ariirimarau Meuel

See also 
 Basketball at the 2023 Pacific Games

References

FIBA
Basketball
2021–22 in Oceanian basketball